Tupong may refer to:
Pseudaphritis urvillii a fish in the family Pseudaphritidae 
Tupong (state constituency), represented in the Sarawak State Legislative Assembly